Afterglow: A Last Conversation with Pauline Kael (2003) is among the last publicly available materials to gather film critic Pauline Kael's thoughts on the movie medium, prior to her death on September 3, 2001. The book was prepared by jazz critic Francis Davis.

Background
In the book, she describes her affinity for the new works of directors such as Quentin Tarantino, Paul Thomas Anderson and David O. Russell, showing an appreciation for Pulp Fiction, Jackie Brown, the first half of Boogie Nights, Magnolia, and Three Kings. She also favorably considers the television shows Sex and the City and the first season of The Sopranos. She laments what she considers to be the declining quality of Steven Spielberg's and Martin Scorsese's recent work.

References 

2003 non-fiction books
Books about film